The terms international waters or transboundary waters apply where any of the following types of bodies of water (or their drainage basins) transcend international boundaries: oceans, large marine ecosystems, enclosed or semi-enclosed regional seas and estuaries, rivers, lakes, groundwater systems (aquifers), and wetlands.

"International waters" is not a defined term in international law. It is an informal term, which sometimes refers to waters beyond the "territorial sea" of any country. In other words, "international waters" is sometimes used as an informal synonym for the more formal term high seas or, in Latin, mare liberum (meaning free sea).

International waters (high seas) do not belong to any state's jurisdiction, known under the doctrine of 'mare liberum'. States have the right to fishing, navigation, overflight, laying cables and pipelines, as well as scientific research.

The Convention on the High Seas, signed in 1958, which has 63 signatories, defined "high seas" to mean "all parts of the sea that are not included in the territorial sea or in the internal waters of a State" and where "no State may validly purport to
subject any part of them to its sovereignty." The Convention on the High Seas was used as a foundation for the United Nations Convention on the Law of the Sea (UNCLOS), signed in 1982, which recognized exclusive economic zones extending  from the baseline, where coastal states have sovereign rights to the water column and sea floor as well as the natural resources found there.

The high seas make up 50% of the surface area of the planet and cover over two-thirds of the ocean.

Ships sailing the high seas are generally under the jurisdiction of the flag state (if there is one); however, when a ship is involved in certain criminal acts, such as piracy, any nation can exercise jurisdiction under the doctrine of universal jurisdiction. International waters can be contrasted with internal waters, territorial waters and exclusive economic zones.

UNCLOS also contains, in its part XII, special provisions for the protection of the marine environment, which, in certain cases, allow port States to exercise extraterritorial jurisdiction over foreign ships on the high seas if they violate international environmental rules (adopted by the IMO), such as the MARPOL Convention.

International waterways

Several international treaties have established freedom of navigation on semi-enclosed seas.

 The Copenhagen Convention of 1857 opened access to the Baltic by abolishing the Sound Dues and making the Danish Straits an international waterway free to all commercial shipping. Separately, the Royal Ordinance of 1999 regulates the access of foreign warships to Danish waters.
 Several conventions have opened the Bosphorus and Dardanelles to shipping. The latest, the Montreux Convention Regarding the Regime of the Turkish Straits, maintains the straits' status as an international waterway.

Other international treaties have opened up rivers, which are not traditionally international waterways.

 The Danube River is an international waterway so that Germany and Croatia, as well as landlocked Austria, Slovakia, Hungary, Serbia and Moldova can have secure access to the Black Sea.

Disputes over international waters

Current unresolved disputes over whether particular waters are "International waters" include:
The Arctic Ocean: While Canada, Denmark, Russia and Norway all regard parts of the Arctic seas as national waters or internal waters, most European Union countries and the United States officially regard the whole region as international waters. The Northwest Passage through the Canadian Arctic Archipelago is one of the more prominent examples, with Canada claiming it as internal waters, while the United States and the European Union considers it an international strait.
 The Southern Ocean: Australia claims an exclusive economic zone (EEZ) around its Antarctic territorial claim. Since this claim is only recognised by four other countries, the EEZ claim is also disputed.
Area around Okinotorishima: Japan claims Okinotorishima is an islet and thus they should have an EEZ around it, but some neighboring countries claim it is an atoll and thus should not have an EEZ.
South China Sea: See Territorial disputes in the South China Sea. Some countries consider (at least part of) the South China Sea as international waters, but this viewpoint is not universal. Notably, China, which opposes any suggestion that coastal States could be obliged to share the resources of the exclusive economic zone with other powers that had historically fished there, claims historical rights to the resources of the exclusive economic zones of all other coastal States in the South China Sea.

In addition to formal disputes, the government of Somalia exercises little control de facto over Somali territorial waters. Consequently, much piracy, illegal dumping of waste and fishing without permit has occurred.

International waters agreements

Global agreements 
 International Freshwater Treaties Database (freshwater only).
 The Yearbook of International Cooperation on Environment and Development profiles agreements regarding the Marine Environment, Marine Living Resources and Freshwater Resources.
 1972 London Convention on the Prevention of Marine Pollution by Dumping of Wastes and Other Matter (London Convention 1972).
 1973 London International Convention for the Prevention of Pollution from Ships, 1973 MARPOL
 1982 United Nations Convention on Law of the Sea (United Nations Convention on Law of the Sea, United Nations; especially parts XII–XIV).
 1997 United Nations Convention on the Law of Non-Navigational Uses of International Watercourses (CIW) – not ratified.
 Transboundary Groundwater Treaty, Bellagio Draft – proposed, but not signed.
 Other global conventions and treaties with implications for International Waters:
 1971 Ramsar Convention on Wetlands.
 1992 Convention on Biological Diversity.

Regional agreements

At least ten conventions are included within the Regional Seas Program of UNEP, including:
 the Atlantic Coast of West and Central Africa
 the North-East Pacific (Antigua Convention)
 the Mediterranean (Barcelona Convention)
 the wider Caribbean (Cartagena Convention)
 the South-East Pacific
 the South Pacific (Nouméa Convention)
 the East African seaboard
 the Kuwait region (Kuwait Convention)
 the Red Sea and the Gulf of Aden (Jeddah Convention)

Addressing regional freshwater issues is the 1992 Helsinki Convention on the Protection and Use of Transboundary Watercourses and International Lakes (UNECE/Helsinki Water Convention)

Water-body-specific agreements
 Baltic Sea (Helsinki Convention on the Protection of the Marine Environment of the Baltic Sea Area, 1992)
 Black Sea (Bucharest Convention)
 Caspian Sea (Framework Convention for the Protection of the Marine Environment of the Caspian Sea)
 Lake Tanganyika (Convention for the Sustainable Management of Lake Tanganyika)

International waters institutions

Freshwater institutions
 The UNESCO International Hydrological Programme (IHP)
 The International Joint Commission between Canada and United States (IJC-CMI)
 The International Network of Basin Organizations (INBO)
 The International Shared Aquifer Resource Management project
 The International Water Boundary Commission (US Section) between Mexico and United States
 The International Water Management Institute (IWMI)
 The IUCN Water and Nature Initiative (WANI)

Marine institutions
 The International Maritime Organization (IMO)
 The International Seabed Authority
 The International Whaling Commission
 The UNEP Regional Seas Programme
 The UNESCO Intergovernmental Oceanographic Commission (IOC)
 The International Ocean Institute
 The IUCN Global Marine and Polar Programme (GMPP)

See also 

 Baseline
 Birth aboard aircraft and ships
 Continental shelf
 Duty-free shop
 Exclusive economic zone
 Extraterritoriality
 Extraterritorial jurisdiction
 Extraterritorial operation
 Freedom of the seas
 Hugo Grotius
 International zone
 Ocean colonization
 Seasteading
 Territorial waters

Explanatory notes

Citations

External links 
 Bibliography on Water Resources and International Law Peace Palace Library
 The GEF International Waters Resource Centre (GEF IWRC)
 The Integrated Management of Transboundary Waters in Europe (TransCat)
 The International Water Law Project
 The International Water Resources Association (IWRA)
 Food and Agriculture Organization
 Ocean Atlas
 Transboundary Marine Protected Areas (MPAs) article
 OneFish fisheries research portal
 Regional Fisheries Bodies of the World portal
 Fishing Zeal 
 The UNDP-GEF article describing international waters from which this article has been adapted.
 UNEP freshwater thematic portal on transboundary waters 
 UNESCO thematic portals for oceans , water, coasts and small islands
 WaterWiki: A new Wiki-based on-line knowledge map and collaboration tool for water-practitioners in the Europe and CIS region

 
 
Law of the sea
Water and politics